The article highlights the forms of propaganda Roman Emperor Augustus employed as he ascended to power.

Augustus employed several forms of artwork and literature to boast the image of the enforcer of the Pax Romana (Roman Peace), alternatively called Pax Augusta. He can be perceived as a historically important figure who effectively utilised propaganda in creating and maintaining his principate. Augustus’ wide range of propaganda targeted all aspects of Roman society, art and architecture to appeal to the population, coinage to represent himself to the masses, and finally literature such as poetry and history for the wealthy upperclass in order to exert power and to maintain peace and prosperity.

The propaganda didn’t only exist as a form of media, but Augustus’ family, the women especially played a pivotal role in helping to maintain the Principate. His family was essential in acting as examples of the ideal Roman citizen, this aspect is clearly enunciated through the responsibility of his wife. Moreover, one of his daughters, Julia the Elder was indispensable in solidifying Augustus' bloodline in future ruling generation, ensuring the continuation of Augustus' successful legacy.

Thus, Augustus’ multi-faceted approach allowed for him to dominate public and private sectors of daily Roman life. Archaeological evidence and scholarly interpretations demonstrate the effectiveness of Augustus’ propaganda.

The images that Augustus desired to project aimed to idolise him in all Roman aspects, from a military with successful triumphs, to a reliable religious leader through reinforcing his divine Julian ancestry. However, most importantly Augustus aimed to stabilise Rome from civil strife as the city had been plagued by fight for power.

Literature

History

Res Gestae 
The most common piece of Augustan literature is the Res Gestae Divi Augusti (The Deeds of the Divine Augustus), a documentation written by Augustus soon before his death, listing out the accomplishments and recognitions he gained in his life. Thus, the text – despite influencing little of his reign – was crucial in carving the image of Augustus that was to remain after his passing. Augustus' intentions are clearly outlined in his first line:A copy below of the deeds of the divine Augustus, by which he subjected the whole wide earth to the rile of the Roman people, and of the money which he spent for the state and Roman people... Immediately Augustus establishes his religious power through the link of the title 'divine'. His importance and actions for the state are constantly referred to throughout the Res Gestae. Augustus demonstrates his military strength through anecdotes of his conquests, building upon how he had heroically avenged his adoptive father Julius Caesar by defeating his assassins. It is said Augustus intended the Res Gestae to be located on the external wall of his mausoleum however archaeologists have found copies in Galatia in Asia Minor and Antioch in Pisidia, reinforcing the idea the emperor had intended to glorify not just his lifetime achievements but Rome as a whole

Though all events written in the Res Gestae can be corroborated, Augustus has chosen to omit information, for example such as Mark Antony's name.

Poetry

Aeneid 
The most famous piece of poetry in Augustus' time was Virgil's Aeneid, essentially narrating the birth of Rome through their founder Aeneas, a surviving Trojan warrior. The poem is symbolic of the origin of the Roman people, and thus linking Augustus as a descendant of Aeneas, Virgil illustrated how Augustus had created a new thriving Rome and how integral he is to Roman culture. Furthermore Virgil provided credibility and reinforced the divinity in Augustus, representing the emperor as written:Time and again you’ve heard his coming promised-Caesar Augustus! Son of a god [Julius Caesar], he will bring back the Age of Gold to the Latian fields where Saturn once held sway, expand his empire past Garamants [North African tribe] and the Indians to a land beyond the stars, beyond the wheel of the year, the course of the sun itself , where Atlas bears the skies and turns on his shoulder the heavens studded with flaming stars. Even now the Caspian and Maeotic kingdoms quake at his coming, oracles sound the alarm and the seven mouths of the Nile churn with fear. Not even Hercules himself could cross such a vast expanse of earth…

Metamorphoses 
Additionally, another Roman author Ovid wrote a piece titled Metamorphoses, detailing the history until the deification of Caesar, which surprisingly includes a short section on Augustus. Ovid's piece strengthened the contributions Augustus provided for the Principate. Seeing his son’s [Augustus] good works, Caesar [Julius] acknowledges they are greater than his own and delights at being surpassed by him.This similarly alludes to Augustus' divine and religious ancestry, and once again refers to how Augustus managed to bring peace and prosperity to Rome. There are also similar references of Augustus' leadership was hinted in the Sibylline Books, Ovid undoubtedly accepting this fact. The fourth book especially, dedicated to Venus, a goddess Julius Caesar claimed he was a descendant of emphasised heavily on Augustus' divine heritage once again solidifying his position as the rightful ruler of Rome.

Art 
Artworks of Augustus also served as propaganda, and though there are not many of the paintings the sculptures of Augustus gave insight to how he wanted himself portrayed.

Sculptures

Type B - Early portraits 

 Classic Greek influence
 Portrays a young man with dignity
 Wavy neat hair, bony but even features, controlled expression reflects firm authority

Actium/Octavian Type Statues 

 Bronze
 Depicted as a youthful ruler
 Modified hellenistic features
 Roman tradition seen in small eyes, pointed chin, knit brows, thin pressed lips
 Wrinkled forehead suggests serious concern for Rome

Prima Porta Type 

 Egyptian type
 Youthful leader
 Majority of portraits found in this style
 Sense of timelessness - removed from life but not deified
 Fuller face, no wrinkles
 Style consolidated his status as imperator Caesar divi filius

Forbes Type 

 Portrait
 Lifelike, less abstract
 Hair less styled
 Proportions of the face more naturally created
 Signs of bones and wrinkles
 Portrays Augustus as princeps and pater patriae

Architecture and building programs 

Through restoring Rome using his building program, Augustus could physically demonstrate the prosperity he created and thereby ensure loyalty from Roman citizens. Augustus mentions in the Res Gestae that he restored eighty-two temples and repaired bridges and aqueducts, including the Theatre of Pompey. In this way, Augustus could prove with these monuments that "Rome was rising again". 

Furthermore, Augustus effectively used his building program to be perceived as an omnipotent restorer of a flourishing Rome. Through securing the city, by extension Augustus was reinforcing his image of the saviour of Rome and the bringer of prosperity and peace. Suetonius and Dio believe this entrapped the support of the senatorial and Equites classes as they were also encouraged to create monuments under their own names, garnering respect and unquestioning loyalty to Augustus.

Examples of notable buildings are the Forum of Augustus, Ara Pacis, Temple of Actian Apollo, and the Temple of Mars Ultor.

Coins 
Wallace-Hadrill explains that there are two ways to interpret the use of Augustan coins. He uses the terms legalistic and charismatic to categorise the types of coins produced to consolidate Augustus' authority. Considering a majority of the Roman population was illiterate, the depiction of Augustus was paramount, especially since it would reach all corners of the empire. The coins were also another method to remind the citizens of their loyalty and service to the principate.

Legalistic 
As an officially recognised coin provided by the Principate, Augustus' idealised image of himself was imbued throughout the currency. These were also known as imperial coins which have been used as a method to estimate how the emperor intended to see themselves. In this way, the emperor decided how he would be portrayed in contrast to the "biased representation of the historian". His most notable coin, Augustus continuing with his image as the avenging son, designed his coins with the phrase DIVI FILIUS, also known as son of the divine to pay homage to his adoptive father Julius Caesar.

Charismatic 

This coin type, although not as significant as legalistic coinage,  did have some effect in creating and maintaining the emperor's image.

An example of this is through Augustus' coin in celebration of his conquest of Egypt. The symbolic win over the so-called barbaric East was an establishment of Augustus' might and force as he was able to eliminate the civil strife that had continually plagued Rome after Caesar's death. This was a feature worth perpetuating through architecture, poetry, and coins, which would be distributed to every part of the empire.

Imperial family and women 

The role of the imperial family in regards to the women, was to decorate and boast Augustus’s image and virtue. 

This is evident in Livia's conduct. She was an idealistic portrayal of a traditional Roman woman due to her morals and ethics. Being a conservative traditionalist, Augustus proposed a series of moral reforms that reinforced the values of a woman being subservient and chaste. Portrayals of Livia in statues conceal her skin, representing a modest and conservative woman. It can be concluded that Livia's main contribution was to help Augustus uphold his moral reforms.

Julia was similarly essential in emphasising the importance of child-bearing and marriage, simply used as a tool for Augustus to advance his moral campaign. By extension, other imperial women were also expected to exhibit the same behaviour of Livia and Julia. However, after a series of marriages and divorces, Julia became known for her adulterous behaviour, clashing with Augustus' morals and was subsequently banished as she no longer conformed to the emperor's values.

References 

Augustus
Propaganda
Mass media in Italy